The Ministry of War of Württemberg was a ministry of the Kingdom of Württemberg, that existed from 1806 to 1919. Its predecessor, the Kriegsratskollegium, was established on 14 March 1705. Each of the four German kingdoms (Württemberg, Prussia, Saxony and Bavaria) continued, according to an 1870 military treaty, to have their own war ministries from the Unification of Germany until the adoption of the 1919 Weimar Constitution, that provided for a unified, federal ministry of defence.

Kingdom of Württemberg
Military of Württemberg
1806 establishments in Germany
1919 disestablishments in Germany
19th-century establishments in Württemberg